Kauhsen was a Formula One constructor from Germany, founded by former sportscar driver Willi Kauhsen. The team started in Formula Two in 1976, purchasing Renault cars, and raced with an assortment of drivers with limited success. Kauhsen then entered the 1979 Formula One season, spending 1978 designing their own chassis with Cosworth engines. They participated in two World Championship Grands Prix with Gianfranco Brancatelli, failing to qualify on both occasions, before the team was shut down.

Formula Two 
Willi Kauhsen, who had raced Porsches and quasi-works Alfa Romeo sports cars, founded his racing team in Formula Two in 1976, buying the championship-winning Elf-Renault 2J Formula Two cars. The cars, driven by Michel Leclère and Klaus Ludwig, were renamed to Kauhsen-Renaults and initially started successfully, with Leclère taking pole at the first race of the 1977 Formula Two championship at Silverstone. Continued modifications to the chassis by Kauhsen however led to downturns in performance, and the car's original performance turned to successive failures to qualify; the poor results making Ludwig leave the squad mid-season. The second seat was then rotated between José Dolhem, Vittorio Brambilla and Alain Prost for the remainder of the season. Brambilla achieved a third place in the second heat at the Misano Circuit, which was the team's best result in the Formula Two championship. Subsequent races saw a best result of 10th for Prost, and with successive retirements and failures to qualify Kauhsen gave up on the championship before the final races.

Formula One 
Bringing in designer Klaus Kapitza from Ford, Kauhsen planned to construct a copy of the Lotus 79, a car that had dominated the 1978 championship due to the use of ground effects. Apart from the chassis, Kauhsen bought the rest of the components from suppliers, including the Cosworth DFV engine utilised by the majority of the teams at the time, and an outdated five-speed gearbox from Hewland. Having planned to follow the then-advanced use of ground effects by Lotus, initial testing of the prototype revealed fundamental design issues; the designers failed to take account of the variable ride height of cars during braking and acceleration, stopping the ground effects functioning correctly. These problems forced the team to redesign the entire car, bringing in drivers Patrick Nève and Harald Ertl to develop a new car with the limited funds available in the months before the Formula One season was to begin.

The problems in getting working ground effects on the chassis led to the team abandoning the concept, and returning to the older "wing car" that had been in prevalence before. These redesigns drained the team of funds; Kauhsen struggled to pay the entry fee for the championship, and only managed to acquire older tyres from Goodyear. After obtaining some sponsorship, and signing Italian driver Gianfranco Brancatelli, the Kauhsen WK004 made its début appearance at the first race of the 1979 British Formula One season in Zolder, albeit retiring early in the race due to engine issues. Brancatelli failed to qualify for the race, being the slowest out of the 27 entries, the closest competitor being three seconds quicker. Running an updated car at the next race in Belgium, Brancatelli again failed to qualify, with a broken clutch preventing an improvement in pace. After the two successive failures, and a lack of funds, Willi Kauhsen withdrew from Formula One and closed the team.

The team's assets were purchased by Arturo Merzario, and was merged with his own eponymous Merzario team, which had been having a similar lack of success with the A2 chassis. The Kauhsen WK was used as the basis for the Gian Paolo Dallara designed Merzario A4 car, but this did not improve from the performance of either of the cars, failing to qualify at the remaining World Championship rounds. The A4's only racing appearance was at the non-championship Dino Ferrari Grand Prix, finishing in 11th place. Merzario later left Formula One at the end of 1979, and moved to the Formula Two championship.

Complete European Formula Two results
(key) (Results in bold indicate pole position; results in italics indicate fastest lap.)

Complete Formula One World Championship results
(key)

References 

Formula One constructors
Formula One entrants
Formula Two entrants
German auto racing teams
German racecar constructors
World Sportscar Championship teams